There have been three baronetcies created for persons with the surname Peel, one in the Baronetage of Great Britain and two in the Baronetage of the United Kingdom.

The Peel baronetcy, of Drayton Manor in the County of Stafford and of Bury in the County Palatine of Lancaster, was created in the Baronetage of Great Britain on 29 November 1800. For more information on this creation, see Earl Peel.

The Peel baronetcy, of Tyersall Hall in the parish of Calverley in the County of York, was created in the Baronetage of the United Kingdom on 2 September 1897 for Theophilus Peel. The title became extinct on his death in 1911.

The Peel baronetcy, of Eyeworth in the County of Bedford, was created in the Baronetage of the United Kingdom on 14 July 1936 for Sidney Peel, member of parliament for Uxbridge from 1918 to 1922. He was the third son of Arthur Peel, 1st Viscount Peel, fifth son of Prime Minister Sir Robert Peel, 2nd Baronet (see Earl Peel). The title became extinct on his death in 1938.

Peel baronets, of Drayton Manor and Bury (1800)
see Earl Peel

Peel baronets, of Tyersall Hall (1897)
Sir Theophilus Peel, 1st Baronet (1837–1911)

Peel baronets, of Eyeworth (1936)
Sir Sidney Cornwallis Peel, 1st Baronet (1870–1938)

References

Kidd, Charles, Williamson, David (editors). Debrett's Peerage and Baronetage (1990 edition). New York: St Martin's Press, 1990.

www.thepeerage.com

Baronetcies in the Baronetage of Great Britain
Extinct baronetcies in the Baronetage of the United Kingdom
Peel family
1800 establishments in Great Britain
1897 establishments in the United Kingdom